New Zealand competed at the 2022 Winter Paralympics in Beijing, China, from 4 to 13 March 2022. The New Zealand team consisted of three alpine skiers, all men. Selection of the New Zealand team was the responsibility of Paralympics New Zealand.

None of the New Zealand athletes participated in the opening ceremony, but Adam Hall was named as hāpai kara, a leadership role equivalent to flagbearer. The New Zealand flagbearer at the closing ceremony was Corey Peters.

The New Zealand team won four medals—one gold, one silver, and two bronzes—to finish 15th on the medal table.

Medallists

Competitors
Three men alpine skiers were named in the New Zealand team on 2 November 2021: Aaron Ewen, Adam Hall, and Corey Peters.

Officials
Jane Stevens was named as the New Zealand team Chef de Mission on 2 November 2021. Also appointed were Lynette Grace as Deputy Chef de Mission, Ben Adams as head coach and Scott Palmer as assistant coach. Other support staff include Bruce Hamilton (medical lead), Graeme White (performance physiotherapist), and Curtis Christian (wax and equipment technician).

Alpine skiing

Sources:

See also
New Zealand at the 2022 Winter Olympics

Footnotes

References

Nations at the 2022 Winter Paralympics
2022
Winter Paralympics